László Babály Sr. (born 14 March 1957) is a Hungarian sprinter. He competed in the men's 4 × 100 metres relay at the 1980 Summer Olympics. His son also represented Hungary in the 4 × 100 metres relay at the 2000 Summer Olympics.

References

1957 births
Living people
Athletes (track and field) at the 1980 Summer Olympics
Hungarian male sprinters
Olympic athletes of Hungary
Place of birth missing (living people)